The Royal Canadian Air Force Academy (RCAFA) is a Canadian Forces training establishment for officers who serve with units of the Royal Canadian Air Force. Based at CFB Borden in central Ontario, it is a unit of fhe RCAF's 16 Wing. It also reports to the 2 Canadian Air Division, which is itself dedicated to the training of RCAF personnel. The RCAFA consists of more than 1,800 students who led by an administrative team consisting of 43 regular force and reservist officers. The school itself is headed by Major Colleen Halpin and Master Warrant Officer Jason Dunfield.

In the early 1990s, the Canadian Forces Air Command became interested in establishing educational facilities to enhance its effectiveness in commissioning officers. As a result, three Junior Leadership schools based in Summerside, Prince Edward Island and Penhold, Alberta were closed and reassigned to the Air Command Professional Development and Training Centre (ACPDTC) in Borden, Ontario. The RCAF Academy began its operations in renovated post-World War II barracks. In addition, the Air Force Indoctrination School Detachment in St-Jean, Quebec, as well as the Canadian Forces School of Air Reserve Training in Penhold also saw their cadets move to Borden. The ACPDTC was officially opened in 1994, and was renamed the Air Command Academy in October 2004.

The motto of the RCAFA is "Discimus Ducere" (Learn to Lead).

Academy crest
In 1994, the ACPDTC adopted the crest of the former Junior Leader School (JLS) Penhold. It was retained by the unit when it was renamed to the RCAF Academy in 2004. The eagle on a blue field is significant of the Junior Leader School's affiliation with RCAF. The rising sun represents the new horizons and goals attainable by the student, which lead to a brighter future.

References

Royal Canadian Air Force
Buildings and structures in Simcoe County
1994 establishments in Ontario 
Universities in Ontario